Oresegun Olumide is a Nigerian hyper-realistic artist. On 8 March 2016, he received media attention in Nigeria and beyond after he posted some of his oil on canvas paintings on social media website Facebook.

Early life and education
Born in Ikorodu, a suburb of Lagos, Olumide's love for drawing and painting started when he was 4. He is an alumnus of Yaba College of Technology, Yaba, Lagos where he graduated with a distinction in Fine Art. He cites Pablo Picasso and Michelangelo di Lodovico Buonarroti Simoni as his role models.

Career

Olumide started painting professionally in 2005. His drawing and painting are inspired by his environment, mostly using water as the principal theme of his works. Olumide currently owns an art studio in Ikorodu where he showcases his works and exhibitions.

References

1981 births
Living people
Artists from Lagos
Yoruba artists
Yaba College of Technology alumni
21st-century Nigerian artists